Basslerocerida is an order of nautiloid cephalopods from the Ordovician comprising exogastric longiconic cyrtocones, that is no longer in common use.

Taxonomy
The Order Basslerocerida was established by Flower and Kummel (1950) for forms intermediary between the ancestral Ellesmerocerida and the more advanced Tarphycerida and Oncocerida. The order, as originally defined, contains two families, the Bassleroceratidae with thick-walled siphuncles which gave rise to the Tarphycerida, and the Graciloceratidae, derived from the former, with thin-walled siphuncles which gave rise to the Onocerida. The speculation in Flower and Kummel (1950) that the Basslerocerida, through the Graciloceratidae, might have given rise to the Barrandeocerida may account for the inclusion of the Barradeocerina in the Basslerocerida in some classifications and the extension of the order to the Devonian. The derivation of barrandeoceroids from within the Tarphycerida is however well established.

Basslerocerida has fallen into general disuse, the taxa now being included in either the Ellesmerocerida or in the derived Tarphycerida and Oncocerida, although Sheverev (2006) continued to recognize the order. Furnish and Glenister (1964) included the Bassleroceratidae in the Ellesmerocerida while Sweet (1964)  included its derivative, the Graciloceratidae, in the Oncocerida. Flower (e.g. 1976) instead included the Bassleroceritidae in the Tarphycerida.

Morphology
Nothing is known about the basslerocerid soft part anatomy, although they may be surmised to have had somewhat squid-like bodies with perhaps 8 or 10 arms.

Shells are rather small, reaching lengths of about 12 –15 cm (5 –6 in); elongate with an upward, exogastric, curvature -like a rocker -and subcircular to laterally compressed cross section. The venter on the outer curvature is commonly more sharply rounded, giving it a keel-like form, than the dorsum on the inner curvature.  Septa are close spaced, the siphuncle ventral.

The siphuncle in the Bassleroceratidae is composed of thick connecting rings as found in the ancestral Ellesmerocerida and in primitive Tarphycerida.  Connecting rings in the derived Graciloceratidae are thin, as found in the  Oncocerida.

References

 Basslerocerida, Paleobiology DB

Nautiloids
Mollusc orders
Ordovician cephalopods
Prehistoric cephalopods of North America
Prehistoric animals of Europe
Prehistoric animals of Asia
Obsolete animal taxa